CUW may refer to:

 Concordia University Wisconsin, a private liberal arts college
 ISO 3166-1 alpha-3 code for Curaçao, a Caribbean constituent country of the Kingdom of the Netherlands
 CUW (railway station), a Welsh railway station that opened in 1854
 CuW, Copper–tungsten, a pseudo-alloy
 cuw, ISO 639-3 code for the Chukwa language of Nepal